University College Boathouse is the boathouse of University College Boat Club (UCBC) on the southern bank of the River Thames (locally known as "The Isis") in Oxford, England. It is owned by University College, Oxford.
UCBC's Boathouse has become an iconic and very recognisable architectural statement in and around Oxford. The boathouse is shared with Wolfson, St Peter's and Somerville College boat clubs.

The original 19th-century boathouse, designed by John Oldrid Scott, was destroyed through arson in 1999. After eight years, a new boathouse designed by Belsize Architects was completed in 2007 at a cost of £2.7million. The Boathouse was awarded a Royal Institute of British Architects (RIBA) prize, and has enjoyed a very favourable reception in the architectural world. An article describes the structure as not just a boathouse, but "a grandstand of the first order" arguing that it represents a new age in rowing.

The Saturday of Eights Week, the main summer rowing event of Oxford University, in 2007 saw the opening of the new boathouse by then-Chairman of the British Olympic Association Colin Moynihan, who had coxed for University College and Oxford University, and won a silver medal at the 1980 Moscow Olympics. The ceremony also marked the dedication of the Coleman Viewing Terrace by Jimmy and Jamie Coleman; it is named due to their gift.

References

2007 establishments in England
Buildings and structures completed in 2007
Buildings and structures on the River Thames
Buildings and structures of the University of Oxford
Rowing at the University of Oxford
Boathouses in the United Kingdom
Boathouse